William Dallas Fyfe Brown (8 October 1931 – 30 November 2004) was a Scottish football goalkeeper.

Brown played for Dundee between 1949 and 1959, and for Tottenham Hotspur between 1959 and 1966. He was part of the Spurs team that won the Double of Football League and FA Cup in 1961 - the first club to achieve the feat in the 20th century. He was also capped 28 times for the Scotland national team.

Career

Dundee

Brown played as a youth for Carnoustie Panmure. He started his senior career with Dundee as a teenager and made over 200 appearances in the Scottish Football League.

Tottenham Hotspur

Brown was signed in 1959 for £16,500 to Tottenham Hotspur in June 1959. He was at White Hart Lane for seven years, winning the Double in 1961 missing only one game the entire season. He also helped the team win the FA Cup again in 1962,and the European Cup Winners' Cup in 1963. He produced one of his best performances in the match against Bratislava in quarter-final of 1962–63 European Cup Winners' Cup.

He suffered injuries in the mid-1960s, and with the arrival of Pat Jennings to the team, he began to lose his place in the starting lineup. He played his last game for the club in a friendly in October 1966, and transferred to Northampton Town the same month.

Northampton and Toronto Falcons

He next had a spell at Northampton Town. Brown then moved to Canada to end his playing days with the Toronto Falcons during the 1967 National Professional Soccer League season.

International
Brown was capped 28 times for Scotland and played in the 1958 World Cup. He also played for his country at 'B' team, youth and schoolboy level. Brown also represented the Scottish League XI while he was with Dundee.

After playing
After he finished playing, he stayed in Canada and worked as a property developer and for the government. He died in 2004, aged 73. The news broke just before Tottenham played a League Cup tie against Liverpool and, as a tribute, they wore black armbands for the occasion.

Honours
Dundee
 Scottish League Cup: 1951–52

Tottenham Hotspur
 Football League First Division: 1960–61
 FA Cup: 1961, 1962
 FA Charity Shield: 1961, 1962 
 European Cup Winners' Cup: 1963

References

1931 births
2004 deaths
1958 FIFA World Cup players
Dundee F.C. players
Expatriate soccer players in Canada
Association football goalkeepers
National Professional Soccer League (1967) players
Naturalized citizens of Canada
Northampton Town F.C. players
Scotland international footballers
Scotland B international footballers
Scottish footballers
Scottish expatriate footballers
Scottish expatriate sportspeople in Canada
Scottish emigrants to Canada
English Football League players
Tottenham Hotspur F.C. players
Toronto Falcons (1967–68) players
People from Arbroath
Footballers from Angus, Scotland
Scottish Football League players
Scottish Football League representative players
Arbroath F.C. players
Carnoustie Panmure F.C. players
Scottish Football Hall of Fame inductees
FA Cup Final players